This is a list of extinct indigenous peoples of Russia.  The list does not include ancient or classical historical tribes in the period of 4000 BC to 500 AD. The list includes tribes of Russia from 500 AD to 1519 AD, also including endangered groups for comparison that are nearing extinction, facing an extinction vortex (500 members or less by the 2002 Census).

Extinct

Slavic migration began in the 6th century and some of indigenous peoples who lived in European Russia and Siberia assimilated by the Russians.

Anaoul Yukaghir assimilated after 18th century
Asan people: In the 18th and 19th centuries they were assimilated by the Evenks
Bulaqs: conquered by the Russians
Chud: extinct after the 12th century.
Kamasins extinction reported in 1989. According to the 2010 Census, population of 2. Almost all of the Kamasins had assimilated with the Russian peasantry by the early 20th century.
Khodynt Yukaghir extinct due to a plague in the late 17th century.
Mators: extinction in 1840s, assimilated by the Russians and Siberian Turkics.
Volga Bulgarians became extinct some time after a Mongol attack in 1430. In modern ethnic nationalism, there is some "rivalry for the Bulgar legacy" (see Bulgarism). The Volga Tatars, Chuvash, and Bulgarians are said to be descended from the Bulgars, as well as (possibly) the Balkars.
Volga Finns
Muromians assimilated by the Russians 12th century.
Merya assimilated by the Russians around 1000 AD.
Meshchera assimilated by the Russians in the 16th century
Yurats Samoyed assimilated into Siberian Nenets people in early 19th century.

Endangered as of 2002 to present
Izhorians 327 members
Kerek 8 members
Russko-ustintsy 8 members
Votes 73 members
Yaskolbinskie Tatar 3 members
Yugh people 19 members
Yugens 1
Yugis 18
Yupik
Sirenik language extinction in 1997. This ethnic group, the Sirenik Eskimos, is no longer enumerated in the census and members and, if surviving, might have changed their identity into another related and larger ethnic group such as Yupik or something completely different.

Endangered as of 2010 Russian Census
Izhorians 266 members
Votes 64 members
Alyutors 25 members
Kerek 4 members
Yugh people 1 member

See also
List of endangered languages in Russia
List of indigenous peoples of Russia
Lists of endangered languages
List of languages by time of extinction
Red Book of Endangered Languages
Expansion of Russia 1500–1800
Russian conquest of Siberia
Russian Colonialism

References 

indigenous, extinct
Russia, extinct
Russia, extinct
Russia, extinct
Indigenous
Extinct ethnic groups
Lists of indigenous peoples of Russia